Fascinación is a 1949 Argentine drama film directed by Carlos Schlieper and starring Alicia Barrié, Héctor Calcaño, and Susana Campos.

Cast
Alicia Barrié 		
Héctor Calcaño 		
Susana Campos 		
Homero Cárpena 		
Arturo de Córdova 		
Ricardo Duggan 		
Rafael Frontaura 			
Elisa Galvé 			
Bernardo Perrone

References

External links
 
 

1949 films
1940s Spanish-language films
Argentine black-and-white films
Films directed by Carlos Schlieper
Argentine drama films
1949 drama films
1940s Argentine films